Xaniothrips is a genus of thrips in the family Phlaeothripidae, which was first described by Laurence Mound in 1971. The type species is Xaniothrips xantes.

Members of this genus are found only in Australia, (in all mainland states and territories with the exception of Victoria) in semi-arid zones, where they are kleptoparasites on Acacias.  That is, they attack and steal the homes (galls) in Acacias created by other thrips species and continue to parasitise the acacia.  Adults use their abdomens to do this.

Species
 Xaniothrips eremus
 Xaniothrips foederatus
 Xaniothrips leukandrus
 Xaniothrips mulga
 Xaniothrips rhodopus
 Xaniothrips xantes
 Xaniothrips zophus

References

External links 

 Lucid factsheet: Xaniothrips (full description)

Phlaeothripidae
Thrips
Thrips genera
Taxa named by Laurence Alfred Mound